Babruysk or Bobruisk is a city in Mogilev Region, eastern Belarus, situated on the Berezina River. , its population was 209,675.

Babruysk is located at the intersection of railroads to Asipovichy, Zhlobin, Aktsyabrski and roads to Minsk, Homyel, Mahilyow, Kalinkavichy, Slutsk, and Rahachow. It has the biggest timber mill in Belarus, and is also known for its chemical, machine building and metal-working industries.

In 2021, there were 38 public schools in Babruysk, with over 24,000 students. There are three schools specializing in music, dance and visual arts. Additionally, there is a medical school and numerous professional technical schools.

Etymology
The name Babruysk (as well as that of the Babruyka River) probably originates from the Belarusian word  ('beaver'), many of which used to inhabit the Berezina. However, beavers in the area had been almost eliminated by the end of the 19th century due to hunting and pollution.

History
Babruysk is one of the oldest cities in Belarus. It was first mentioned in writing in the middle of the 14th century. Investigations by archaeologists revealed that in the 5th and 6th centuries there existed Slavic settlements up the river Biarezina from where Babruysk is currently located; findings of stone tools and weapons suggest that people have lived in the area since the Stone Age.

During the reign of Vladimir I, Prince of Kiev, in place of modern-day Babruysk there was a village whose inhabitants were occupied with fishing and beaver trapping. This is where the name Babruysk originated. For many centuries Babruysk was part of the Polish–Lithuanian Commonwealth and was an important militarily fortified border post. In the 14th century a castle was built on one of the hills near the Berezina River.

Babruysk was not only a major military base, but also a prominent trade center. There is evidence of a market containing nearly one hundred stalls, which implies significant financial activity. In the first half of the 17th century Babruysk became a big trade outpost thanks to its strategic position at the intersection of major trade routes and the Berezina river. There was a flowering of skilled tradesmen, including carpenters, blacksmiths, goldsmiths, and bakers. The population in the first half of the 17th century was between 2,000 and 5,000 people.

These included a protective earth barrier, wooden walls, and almost a dozen two-story watchtowers. In the walls there were openings designed for the placement of firearms. After the Second Partition of Poland in 1793 it came into the hands of Imperial Russia. In 1810, the construction of a fortress began to mark the border between Russia and Austria and Prussia; in 1812 it was almost completed and was successful in repelling Napoleon's attack for four months. After the war the building was renewed on a large scale, and it was completed in 1820. That was one of the western Russian fortresses. The Babruysk fortress has served its purpose for many decades and today it is a major tourist attraction.

The 1861 census showed a population of 15,766. The ethnic groups living in Babruysk included Belarusians, Ukrainians, Poles, and Jews. As in other cities of Belarus, most of the buildings were constructed from wood. In 1866 there were 1498 houses, only 29 of which were made from brick.

There was a steady increase in the Jewish population of Babruysk following the Napoleonic wars. By 1897, in the population of 34,336 citizens, 60%, or 20,760 were Jews. Most of them were employed in crafts, industry, and trade.

During the 1890s, the citizens of Babruysk witnessed pogroms after the assassination of the Russian emperor Alexander II. Many of the attacks were repelled by armed Jewish self-defense.

In 1902, the Great Fire of Babruysk left 2,500 families homeless and destroyed over 250 business, 15 schools and the market. There were more than 7 million rubles in property damage, however the city was quickly rebuilt, this time with brick and stone.

In 1904 the 40th Infantry Division of the Imperial Russian Army had its headquarters here.

Between February 2 and March 11, 1918, was a Battle of Bobrujsk, between units of the Polish I Corps in Russia, commanded by General Jozef Dowbor-Musnicki, fought with the Red Army over the control of the city and region of Babruysk. 
In 1918–1920, town was captured by Polish liberation forces.

On 28 June 1941, troops of the German Army Group Centre captured Babruysk. Believing that German troops would not target civilians, many Jews stayed behind. Consequently, 20,000 Babruysk Jews were shot and buried in mass graves. Ghetto and labor camps were established in the southwest part of town. The conditions inside the camps were horrible and involved lack of food, lack of sanitation and perpetual abuse by the Nazi guards. Soon the Nazis began executing the Jews in the ghetto in groups of about 30. By 1943 all labor camps had been liquidated and the remaining Jews killed. The few Jews who escaped joined partisan forces in the surrounding forest and went about attacking enemy railroad lines. There is a small memorial dedicated to the memory of Babruysk Jews killed in the Holocaust, located in the Nahalat Yitzhak cemetery, Giv'atayim, Israel, as part of the Babi Yar memorial.

On June 29, 1944, the Red Army liberated Babruysk. The city lay in ruins; while the population had been 84,107 in 1939, it was down to 28,352 following the war. The difficult process of rebuilding was conducted by thousands of workers and war prisoners who labored to clear factories and streets of rubble and filled in craters made by the bombardment. The machine building plant had been almost completely destroyed, but was restored to working order by the end of 1944. Many other factories and facilities were also rebuilt.

Between 1944 and 1954, Babruysk served as an administrative center of Babruysk Voblast.

The population recovered swiftly as well. In 1959 it was 96,000, in 1965 – 116,000, in 1968 – 122,500, in 1970 – 136,000 and by 1989, 232,000 people were living in Babruysk. This was mostly due to urbanization, where people moved into the city from the surrounding rural areas.

Climate
This climatic region is typified by large seasonal temperature differences, with warm to hot (and often humid) summers and cold (sometimes severely cold) winters. According to the Köppen Climate Classification system, Babruysk has a humid continental climate, abbreviated "Dfb" on climate maps.

Notable people
 Abba Ahimeir (November 2, 1897 – June 6, 1962), journalist, historian and political activist. One of the ideologues of Revisionist Zionism, he was the founder of the Revisionist Maximalist faction of the Zionist Revisionist Movement (ZRM) and of the clandestine Brit HaBirionim.
 Andrei Arlovski (born 1979), former UFC Heavyweight champion.
 Both founders of the Russian band Bi-2 were from Babruysk.
  (born 1981), Ukrainian film director and screenwriter.
 Eliyahu Dobkin (December 31, 1898 – October 26, 1976), leading figure of the Labor Zionism movement, a signatory of the Israeli declaration of independence and a founder of the Israel Museum. He was also active in the Jewish Agency and the World Zionist Organization.
 Celia Dropkin (1887–1956), American Yiddish poet.
 Arkadi Duchin (born 1963), Israeli singer-songwriter and musical producer.
 Baruch Epstein (1860–1941), Lithuanian rabbi, best known for his Temimah commentary on the Torah. He was the son of Rabbi Yechiel Michel Epstein.
 Yechiel Michel Epstein (January 24, 1829 – February 24, 1908), rabbi and authority in Jewish law in Lithuania, known for his book Aruch HaShulchan.
 Joshua Louis Goldberg (January 6, 1896 – December 24, 1994), American rabbi, who was the first rabbi to be commissioned as a U.S. Navy chaplain in World War II (and only the third to serve in the Navy in its history), the first to reach the rank of Navy Captain (the equivalent of Army Colonel), and the first to retire after a full active-duty career.
 Zalman Gorelik (1908–1987), geologist, specialising in tectonics
 Avraham Katznelson (1888 – May 18, 1956), Zionist political figure in Mandate Palestine and a signatory of the Israeli declaration of independence.
 Berl Katznelson (1887–1944), chief figure in Labor Zionism, instrumental to the establishment of the modern state of Israel.
 Rachel Katznelson-Shazar (October 24, 1885 – August 11, 1975), active figure in the Zionist movement. Her husband was Zalman Shazar, the third President of the State of Israel.
 Ruslan Kogan (born 1982), Australian entrepreneur and self-made millionaire.
 Kadish Luz (1895–1972), Israeli Minister of Agriculture (1955–1959) and Speaker of the Knesset (1959–1969), acting president for one month in 1963.
 Alexander Mikhailovich Orlov (born Leiba Lazarevich Feldbin; August 21, 1895 – March 25, 1973), colonel in the Soviet secret police and NKVD Rezident in the Second Spanish Republic. In 1938, Orlov refused to return to the Soviet Union because he realized that he would be executed, and instead fled with his family to the United States.
 Grigory Nemtsov (1948–2010), Latvian journalist and politician.
 Yelena Piskun (born 1978), two-time world champion in artistic gymnastics.
 Ilia Rodov Israeli art historian.
 Dovid Raskin (1927–2011), rabbi associated with the Chabad-Lubavitch Hasidic movement.
 Efraim Sevela (1928–2010), Soviet writer, screenwriter, director, and producer, who after his emigration from the Soviet Union lived in Israel, USA and Russia.
 David Shimoni (August 25, 1891 – December 10, 1956), Israeli poet, writer and translator.
 Eliyahu Simpson (1889–1976), rabbi
 Yitzhak Tabenkin (1888–1971), Zionist activist and politician, one of the founders of the Kibbutz Movement.
 Yosef Tunkel (1881–August 9, 1949) was a Jewish–Belarusian–American writer of poetry and humorous prose in Yiddish.
 Gary Vaynerchuk (born 1975), serial entrepreneur, CEO, investor, author, public speaker, internet personality and self-proclaimed owner of the American football team New York Jets.
 Avraam Zak (1829–1893), Russian-Jewish banker and philanthropist.

International relations 

Babruysk is twinned with:

 Anenii Noi, Moldova
 Batumi, Georgia
 Comrat, Moldova
 Daugavpils, Latvia
 Grozny, Russia
 Gulbene, Latvia
 Hengyang, China
 Iglesias, Italy
 Ishim, Russia
 Kobuleti, Georgia
 Kolpino, Russia
 Kostroma, Russia
 Luga, Russia
 Morogoro, Tanzania
 Murom, Russia
 Naro-Fominsky District, Russia
 Novomoskovsk, Russia
 Odense, Denmark
 Oskemen, Kazakhstan
 Petrogradsky (Saint Petersburg), Russia
 Púchov, Slovakia
 Samarkand, Uzbekistan
 Sevlievo, Bulgaria
 Shaoxing, China
 Sokolniki (Moscow), Russia
 Talin, Armenia
 Vladimir, Russia
 Warsaw West County, Poland
 Wuxi, China

Places of interest 
Church of the Immaculate Conception of Saint Virgin Mary, a Catholic church built between 1901 and 1903;
The Babruysk fortress, 1810–1836;
, 1912;
The , 1892–1894;
 The , 1905–1907.

In popular culture

 The city was mentioned in Ilf and Petrov's book The Little Golden Calf as "a wonderful, highly civilized place".

 'Go to Babrujsk, animal' was a popular meme from padonkaffsky jargon, popular in the Russian-speaking segment of the Internet in the early 2000s. Its origin could be a reference to the quote from The Little Golden Calf. 
 In the Star Trek: The Next Generation episode titled "Family", there is an Earth Station Bobruisk, named for the city in Belarus.
 In Tanki Online there is a map titled Bobruisk loosely based on the city.
 Popular travel vlogger Bald and Bankrupt featured Babruysk in a video entitled "Back To The USSR | Lost In The Belarus Provinces".

References

External links

Bobruysk. Synagogues
Bobruisk.by – Official Babruysk website
Bobr.by  – Popular Babruysk related portal
Photos on Radzima.org
Photos of famous historical sites in Babrujsk
Babruysk website
The murder of the Jews of Babruysk during World War II, at Yad Vashem website.

 

 
Cities in Belarus
Bobruysky Uyezd
Minsk Voivodeship
Shtetls
Populated places in Mogilev Region
Holocaust locations in Belarus
Jewish communities destroyed in the Holocaust